Spectral analysis or spectrum analysis is analysis in terms of a spectrum of frequencies or related quantities such as energies, eigenvalues, etc.  In specific areas it may refer to: 

 Spectroscopy in chemistry and physics, a method of analyzing the properties of matter from their electromagnetic interactions
 Spectral estimation, in statistics and signal processing, an algorithm that estimates the strength of different frequency components (the power spectrum) of a time-domain signal.  This may also be called frequency domain analysis
 Spectrum analyzer, a hardware device that measures the magnitude of an input signal versus frequency within the full frequency range of the instrument
 Spectral theory, in mathematics, a theory that extends eigenvalues and eigenvectors to linear operators on Hilbert space, and more generally to the elements of a Banach algebra
 In nuclear and particle physics, gamma spectroscopy, and high-energy astronomy, the analysis of the output of a pulse height analyzer for characteristic features such as spectral line, edges, and various physical processes producing continuum shapes

See also
Multispectral analysis
Harmonic analysis